Ishakha International University Bangladesh is a private university located in Kishorganj, Bangladesh. The government of Bangladesh approved the establishment of Ishakha International University Bangladesh in 2012 under the Private University Act (PUA) 1992 (now replaced by PUA 2010). Financial support came from the United Group, a Bangladeshi business conglomerate. The University Grants Commission declared certificates issued by the university void.

References 

Private universities in Bangladesh
Educational institutions established in 2012
2012 establishments in Bangladesh